Soraya Qasemi (born 19 December 1940) is an Iranian actress. She was born in Tehran and her mother Hamideh Kheirabadi was known as Mother of the Iranian Cinema.

Filmography
 2020: Aghazadeh (TV series)
 2013: Sounds of Rain (TV series) 
 2012: Maternal Lullabies (TV movie) 
 2011: The Recall (TV Series)
 2008: Invitation (Davat) 2008: Predicament (Makhmaseh)
 2007: The Trial 2005: Salvation at 8:20 2005: The Birthday Chant 2002: The Last Supper 2002: The Pastry Girl 2002: Tenth Night 2001: Khakestari 2001: Maral 1992: The Statue 1989: Courtship 1988: Wolves (TV series)
 1988: Setare o almas 1979: Zende bad 1973: Tranquility in the Presence of Others 1972: Bitter and Sweet'' (TV series)

References

External links

1940 births
Living people
People from Tehran
Actresses from Tehran
Iranian film actresses
Iranian stage actresses
Iranian voice actresses
Iranian television actresses
20th-century Iranian actresses
21st-century Iranian actresses
Crystal Simorgh for Best Actress winners
Crystal Simorgh for Best Supporting Actress winners